Dickinson Bay is an inlet of Galveston Bay in Texas, United States within the Greater Houston metropolitan area. It is fed by Dickinson Bayou and the community of San Leon sits on a peninsula to its north.

References
 

Bodies of water of Chambers County, Texas
Geography of Houston
Greater Houston
Galveston Bay Area
Bays of Texas